Deep River is a town in Middlesex County, Connecticut. The population was 4,415 at the 2020 census. The town center is designated by the U.S. Census Bureau as a census-designated place (CDP). Deep River is part of what the locals call the "Tri-town Area", made up of the towns of Deep River, Chester, and Essex.

Geography

Principal communities
Deep River Center
Winthrop

History

Saybrook Colony formally joined Connecticut in 1644. The portion of the original colony east of the Connecticut River was set off as a separate town in 1665. The site of the present village of Deep River was said to have been owned by John, Nathaniel, and Philip Kirtland in 1723. The village of Winthrop was said to have been settled by Baptists as early as 1729. In the early to mid-19th century, various portions of Saybrook broke off as separate towns, starting from Chester in 1836 to Old Saybrook in 1854. In 1947, the town of Saybrook changed its name to "Deep River", matching the name of the town center village. The name "Deep River" was taken from the river/stream that once powered mills and factories that runs through it and not from the Connecticut River that is its eastern border. The actual Deep River stream begins at the border of its neighboring Town of Chester, in the western Winthrop section of town, on Cedar Swamp Road and flows through town to the stream that can be seen on Route 154, near Winter Avenue, empty onto the cove that connects to The Connecticut River. Source: Deep River,the Illustrated Story of a  Connecticut River Town by Daniel J. Connors, 1966, The Pequot Press, Stonington, Ct. pages17, 19, 20, 27, 37,41, also "Wharf to Waterfall" permanent exhibit, Deep River Historical Society, Inc. 245 Main Street, Deep River, CT 06417, 2020–21

Towns created from Saybrook Colony

Saybrook Colony, along the mouth of the Connecticut River, was one of the early settlements in the area. Several towns broke off and incorporated separately over the course of time. The towns which were created from parts of Saybrook Colony are listed below.

Lyme (originally East Saybrook) in 1665
East Lyme created from Lyme in 1839 (also partly from Waterford)
Old Lyme (originally South Lyme) created from Lyme in 1855
Chester in 1836
Westbrook in 1840
Essex (originally Old Saybrook) in 1852
Old Saybrook created from Essex in 1854

Ivory
From 1840 to around 1940, the U.S. was the world's biggest buyer of ivory and most of that ivory went to Deep River. Phineas Pratt developed an ivory lathe and eventually Deep River became known as "the queen of the valley" due to wealth from the ivory industry. The rival Comstock, Cheney & Company was established in nearby Ivoryton in the 1860s.

Points of interest
These sites in town are on the National Register of Historic Places:
 Deep River Freight Station – 152 River St.; since December 21, 1994
 Deep River Town Hall – Connecticut Route 80 and Connecticut Route 154; since January 1, 1976
 Doris (Sailing yacht) – Connecticut River off River Rd.; located there when NRHP-listed, May 31, 1984
 Pratt, Read and Company Factory Complex – Main St. between Bridge and Spring Sts. and 5 Bridge St.; since August 30, 1984
 The grave of XYZ – Mysterious bank robber's grave w/ "XYZ" initials. Fountain Hill Cemetery. Knock thrice.
 Mount Saint John – 135 Kirtland St.

Events
Every year on the third Saturday in July, Deep River hosts the Deep River Ancient Muster, the largest one day gathering of fife and drum corps in the United States.

Demographics

As of the census of 2000, there were 4,610 people, 1,824 households, and 1,262 families living in the town. The racial makeup of the town was 94.56% White, 2.41% African American, 0.04% Native American, 0.80% Asian, 0.07% Pacific Islander, 1.04% from other races, and 1.08% from two or more races. Hispanic or Latino of any race were 2.95% of the population.

There were 1,824 households, out of which 30.2% had children under the age of 18 living with them, 56.6% were married couples living together, 9.1% had a female householder with no husband present, and 30.8% were non-families. 24.0% of all households were made up of individuals, and 8.7% had someone living alone who was 65 years of age or older. The average household size was 2.46 and the average family size was 2.93.

In the town, the population was spread out, with 24.3% under the age of 18, 5.4% from 18 to 24, 30.6% from 25 to 44, 26.3% from 45 to 64, and 13.3% who were 65 years of age or older. The median age was 39 years. For every 100 females, there were 98.5 males. For every 100 females age 18 and over, there were 96.6 males.

The median income for a household in the town was $51,677, and the median income for a family was $62,260. Males had a median income of $46,268 versus $32,454 for females. The per capita income for the town was $32,604. About 3.9% of families and 5.1% of the population were below the poverty line, including 4.7% of those under age 18 and 7.8% of those age 65 or over.

CDP

As of the census of 2000, there were 2,470 people, 1,023 households, and 652 families living in the Deep River Center CDP. The population density was 943.2 inhabitants per square mile (364.0/km2). The racial makeup of the CDP was 92.19% White, 3.72% African American, 0.08% Native American, 0.61% Asian, 0.04% Pacific Islander, 1.94% from other races, and 1.42% from two or more races. Hispanic or Latino of any race were 3.81% of the population.

There were 1,023 households, out of which 26.7% had children under the age of 18 living with them, 50.0% were married couples living together, 10.6% had a female householder with no husband present, and 36.2% were non-families. 29.2% of all households were made up of individuals, and 9.8% had someone living alone who was 65 years of age or older. The average household size was 2.30 and the average family size was 2.84.

In the CDP the population was spread out, with 23.1% under the age of 18, 6.3% from 18 to 24, 31.6% from 25 to 44, 24.9% from 45 to 64, and 14.0% who were 65 years of age or older. The median age was 38 years. For every 100 females, there were 101.1 males. For every 100 females age 18 and over, there were 95.9 males.

The median income for a household in the CDP was $44,680, and the median income for a family was $51,685. Males had a median income of $42,958 versus $30,880 for females. The per capita income for the CDP was $27,261. About 3.9% of families and 5.5% of the population were below the poverty line, including 7.0% of those under age 18 and 3.5% of those age 65 or over.

Education

The towns of Deep River, Chester, and Essex make up Regional School District #4. Deep River is home to Deep River Elementary School, serving grades K–6. John Winthrop Middle School and Valley Regional High School, serve students for grades 7–8 and 9–12, and are located on Warsaw Street and Kelsey Hill Road, respectively. Additionally, the Connecticut Transition Academy at Mount Saint John which serves students for grades from elementary to high school which is located on Kirtland Street and across the river from Gillette Castle State Park, respectively.

Transportation
The Estuary Transit District provides public transportation throughout Deep River and the surrounding towns through its 9 Town Transit Service. Services include connections to the Old Saybrook Train Station, served by Amtrak and Shoreline East railroads.

Notable people
Diamond D, Derek Damato, All American Soccer Player
Elizabeth Jarvis Colt, wife of firearms manufacturer Samuel Colt
Benjamin Hyde Edgerton, surveyor and politician
Mysterious Dave Mather, Wild West gunfighter
Gretchen Mol, actress
Alpheus S. Williams, lawyer, judge, journalist, U.S. Congressman, and Union general in the American Civil War

References

External links

Town government Web site
Deep River National Bank chartered 1865

 
Towns in Middlesex County, Connecticut
Connecticut populated places on the Connecticut River
Towns in Connecticut
Greater Hartford
1635 establishments in Connecticut